The Oklahoma State Bureau of Investigation (OSBI) is an independent state law enforcement agency of the government of Oklahoma. The OSBI assists the county sheriff offices and city police departments of the state, and is the primary investigative agency of the state government. OSBI works independent of the Oklahoma Department of Public Safety to investigate criminal law violations within the state at the request of statutory authorized requesters. The OSBI was created in 1925 during the term of Governor Martin E. Trapp.

The OSBI is governed by a seven-member commission, with each member of the commission appointed by the Governor of Oklahoma. The commission then appoints a director, who serves at the pleasure of the commission, as the chief executive officer of the OSBI. The current director is Aungela Spurlock and was appointed to serve as Director on September 1, 2022.

History

Origins
In the early 1920s gangs of outlaws roamed the state robbing and burglarizing banks and terrorizing the citizens of many Oklahoma towns. These gangsters often escaped lawmen by fleeing across county lines. The United States Marshals Service was the only law enforcement agency with statewide jurisdiction, but its officers were outnumbered by the bandits.

In 1925, Governor of Oklahoma Martin E. Trapp, in his State of the State address recommended the creation of an agency of special investigators or state police to combat the outlaws. The Oklahoma Legislature appropriated $78,000 to establish the Bureau of Criminal Identification and Investigation. A year after its creation, the Bureau's three agents or operatives were credited with reducing the number of bank robberies in the state by roughly 75 percent. Agents accomplished this by developing leads and using informants which were considered by many to be innovative investigative techniques at the time.

In 1939, the Bureau was taken out from under the direction of the Adjutant General's Office and became a division of the Oklahoma Department of Public Safety. It was during these years that the agency became known as the State Crime Bureau. This arrangement lasted until 1957, when the Bureau was placed under the direct control of the Governor's Office and renamed the Oklahoma State Bureau of Investigation. Also in 1957, the OSBI began to emerge as a professional law enforcement agency. In 1968, employees were placed under the merit system and for the first time, working for the agency was seen as a career opportunity rather than temporary employment.

Independence
In the wake of a controversial investigation of Governor David Hall by the Bureau, the agency was removed from the direct control of the Governor's Office. In 1976, a seven-member independent commission was created to oversee the activities of the OSBI. The makeup of the Commission includes: one police chief, one sheriff, one district attorney and four lay members. These members are appointed by the Governor and approved by the Oklahoma Senate to serve seven year staggered terms. In general, the OSBI Commission appoints the Director, hears complaints, establishes guidelines and serves as a buffer between the Bureau and potential political pressures concerning any particular investigations.

21st Century
On September 11, 2002, the OSBI was recognized as the first Oklahoma state law enforcement agency to be accredited by the Commission on Accreditation for Law Enforcement Agencies.

On July 1, 2009, OSBI assumed the research functions of the Oklahoma Criminal Justice Resource Center and the Oklahoma Sentencing Commission, which were dissolved at that time. OSBI is now officially recognized by the United States Bureau of Justice Statistics as the State Analysis Center.

Responsibilities
The OSBI is responsible for serving as the lead scientific agency for the Oklahoma law enforcement community. The Oklahoma Legislature has directed OSBI to maintain a nationally accredited scientific laboratory to assist all law enforcement agencies in the discovery and detection of criminal activity. As such, OSBI operates the State Forensic Science Center in Edmond and four Regional Forensic Laboratories/Facilities across the State. OSBI also maintains a Statewide identification system which includes fingerprints, criminal history records, juvenile identification records, and DNA profiles.

OSBI also serves as the leading criminal investigation agency in the State. OSBI Agents partner with other state, county, and local law enforcement agencies to detect crime. OSBI provides assistance to the Oklahoma Highway Patrol, Oklahoma Bureau of Narcotics, the Oklahoma Chief Medical Examiner, all district attorneys, local sheriff's office, and municipal police departments when assistance is requested. It is the duty of the OSBI to investigate and detect any and all criminal activity when so directed by the Governor of Oklahoma. Typical crimes investigated by OSBI at the request of other agencies are Part 1 Crimes: aggravated assault, forcible rape, murder, robbery, arson, burglary, larceny-theft, and motor vehicle theft.

The OSBI has original jurisdiction over, and may on its own initiative investigate, the following crimes:
Vehicle and oil field equipment theft
Criminal threats to public officials
Computer crimes
Crimes committed on the State's turnpikes

For any crime that OSBI does not have original jurisdiction over, a requesting agency must seek OSBI assistance in order for OSBI to investigate the crime. There are only a limited number of agencies or officials that can request the OSBI to conduct an investigation. They are:
Police Chiefs
County Sheriffs
District Attorneys
The Attorney General of Oklahoma
The Governor of Oklahoma
The Oklahoma Council on Judicial Complaints
The Director of (or designee of) the Oklahoma Department of Human Services related to child abuse investigations
Any District Judge related to a child abuse investigations
The Chair of any committee of the Oklahoma Legislature which has subpoena power

Leadership
The Oklahoma State Bureau of Investigation is under the supervision of the Oklahoma Secretary of Safety and Security. The OSBI Director, who is appointed by the OSBI Commission, has direct control over the OSBI. Under Governor of Oklahoma Kevin Stitt, Tricia Everest is serving as the Secretary and Aungela Spurlock is serving as OSBI Director.

OSBI Commission
OSBI is governed by a seven-member OSBI Commission, with all members being appointed by the Governor of Oklahoma, with the approval of the Oklahoma Senate, to serve seven year terms. Governor may remove any member at any time only for cause. No more than two members of the Commission may reside in the same congressional district. Four members must be ordinary citizens, one must be a sitting district attorney, one must be a sitting county sheriff, and one must be a sitting chief of police.

As of 2023, the current members of the OSBI Commission are:
 Vic Regalado – chairman sheriff member 
 Bryan Smith – vice chairman lay member
 Angela Marsee – D.A. member
 Ron Cunningham – lay member
 W. Roger Webb – lay member
 Tim Turner – lay member
 Joe Prentice - chief member

Rank structure

Divisions

Operational Section 
Under the direction of the OSBI Director, Aungela Spurlock, this section is organized as follows:

 Legal Division
 Public Information Office
 Investigative Division
 Criminalistics Division

Legal Division 
The mission of the OSBI Legal Department is to identify, anticipate, and address the legal needs of the OSBI by providing timely, thorough, and accurate information to the agency, criminal justice community, and the public.

The OSBI Legal Department will offer proactive, consistent and reliable advice and representation at all times. It will always provide innovative, progressive thinking to assist in solving the problems faced by the OSBI. It will be a place where the "old tried and true" methods will be supplemented with "thinking outside the box". It will be a place where "ideas come to thrive", not to die. It will become more involved in providing training to the OSBI and the law enforcement community and will be a leading force in efforts to identify and provide learning opportunities. It will provide focused legal updates and alerts targeted directly and specifically to employees' unique concerns and needs. The attorneys of the OSBI Legal Department will be recognized as experts in legal issues affecting the law enforcement community and will submit and publish scholarly works designed to educate the public and the legal community on issues concerning the OSBI. It will become more active in the actual prosecution of criminal matters by directly representing the OSBI in discovery disputes, property disposition issues, warrants and subpoenas, and other evidentiary Motions and Applications in criminal cases throughout the state.

Public Information Office 
The OSBI Public Information Officer (PIO) disseminates information to the public in numerous ways including social media. The Bureau uses an alert system called Nixle. By signing up for Nixle at https://www.nixle.com, you can choose if you want the information via text message or e-mail. The OSBI Public Information Office also updates the OSBI Facebook page and Twitter account.

The Public Information Office strives to pursue opportunities to promote the good works of the bureau while keeping the public informed. The PIO uses numerous outlets for dissemination of information including an OSBI Twitter account you can follow at OSBI_OK, the OSBI Facebook page, the OSBI website, and the information alert system Nixle. These are all available to anyone in the public who wishes to follow the bureau.

The Oklahoma State Bureau of Investigation is not subject to the Oklahoma Open Records Act. Oklahoma Statute 74 § 150.5(D) states:D. 1. All records relating to any investigation being conducted by the Bureau, including any records of laboratory services provided to law enforcement agencies pursuant to paragraph 1 of Section 150.2 of this title, shall be confidential and shall not be open to the public or to the Commission except as provided in Section 150.4 of this title; provided, however, officers and agents of the Bureau may disclose, at the discretion of the Director, such investigative information to:

a. officers and agents of federal, state, county, or municipal law enforcement agencies and to district attorneys, in the furtherance of criminal investigations within their respective jurisdictions,

b. employees of the Department of Human Services in the furtherance of child abuse investigations, and

c. appropriate accreditation bodies for the purposes of the Bureau's obtaining or maintaining accreditation.

2. Any unauthorized disclosure of any information contained in the confidential files of the Bureau shall be a misdemeanor… Violation hereof shall be deemed willful neglect of duty and shall be grounds for removal from office.

Investigative Services Division 
The primary duty of the OSBI Investigative Services Division is to assist local law enforcement agencies in solving crimes. OSBI agents offer a number of services including collecting and preserving evidence at crime scenes, participating in undercover investigations to obtain information and evidence, interviewing witnesses and apprehending criminals. Agents investigate many types of crime, including: homicides, rapes, assaults, white collar crime, public corruption, property crimes such as burglaries, Internet crimes against children, child abuse, auto theft and oil field theft. Services also include polygraph examinations, electronic surveillance, crime scene investigations, forensic art, judicial backgrounds, and local law enforcement training in areas of basic and advanced criminal investigations. Specially trained Crime Scene Agents are located statewide, ready at all times to conduct crime scene investigations as well as to collect and preserve evidence from the scenes they investigate.

The OSBI Investigative Services Division is home to the Criminal Intelligence Unit which provides investigative support to the division, as well as home to the Oklahoma State Clearinghouse for the National Center for Missing and Exploited Children.

The Division is divided into six regional investigative offices with geographic based jurisdiction and five headquarters investigative units with functional based authority and State-wide jurisdiction:

Regional Investigative Units
Northwest Region Office - Woodward
Northwest Satellite Office - Weatherford
Southwest Region Office - Duncan
North Central Region Office - Stillwater
South Central Region Office - Headquarters
Northeast Region Office - Tulsa
Northeast Satellite Office - Tahlequah
Southeast Region Office - McAlester
Southeast Satellite Office - Antlers
Headquarters Units
Internet Crimes Against Children Unit
Special Investigations Unit
Crime Scene Investigations Unit
Sexual Assault Kit Initiative (SAKI) Unit
Crimes Information Unit

Criminalistics Services Division 
Created in 1953, the Oklahoma State Bureau of Investigation’s Criminalistics Services Division (CSD) provides a multitude of forensic science services to law enforcement agencies operating within Oklahoma. The Division provides services out of three strategically located laboratories and two evidence receiving facilities throughout the State with following services offered:  Latent Evidence, Firearms & Toolmarks, Forensic Biology (including CODIS), Trace Evidence, Controlled Substances, and Forensic Toxicology.  The regional laboratories and facilities are:

 Forensic Science Center Laboratory - Edmond, OK
 Eastern Regional Facility – McAlester, OK
 Northeastern Regional Laboratory – Tahlequah, OK
 Northwestern Regional Laboratory – Enid, OK
 Southwestern Regional Facility – Lawton, OK
The OSBI CSD Quality System addresses a myriad of components critical to quality work, including requirements for areas such as personnel (educational requirements, training, competency testing, on-going proficiency testing, etc.), methods (appropriately documented, validated, inclusion of appropriate standards and controls, etc.), and equipment (maintenance, calibration, etc.).  In addition, the CSD continuously monitors the quality of services provided and identifies opportunities for improvement.

The CSD consists of six testing disciplines and a physical evidence unit providing services listed below.

 Physical Evidence Unit - receiving of evidence ensuring evidence is properly packaged, sealed, and labeled.  Evidence is logged into the OSBI lab system and tracked from the time it enters the OSBI lab system through property rooms, personnel handling evidence until it is released back to the requesting agency.
 Latent Evidence Unit – specializes in latent print and footwear collection, examination, development, and comparison.
 Firearms & Toolmarks Unit – specializes in the identification of fired ammunition components (bullets and cartridge cases), firearms functionality, Integrated Ballistics Identification System (IBIS) entry, serial number restoration, distance determination, and toolmark identification.
 Forensic Biology Unit – the Forensic Biology discipline is housed at two locations in the state, the FSC in Edmond, OK, and Northeastern Regional Laboratory in Tahlequah, OK.  The Forensic Biology discipline specializes in the identification of body fluids and deoxyribonucleic acid (DNA) analysis of samples collected in criminal investigations.
 Trace Evidence Unit – offers analysis in the areas of fiber, paint, physical match, ignitable liquids, pressure tape and adhesive analysis, gunshot residue, and elemental analysis.
 Controlled Substances Unit – the Controlled Substances Unit is housed in three locations within the state, the FSC, in Edmond, OK, the Northeastern Regional Laboratory in Tahlequah, OK, and the Northwestern Regional Laboratory in Enid, OK.  The Controlled Substances Unit specializes in analysis of unknown powders, crystals, liquids, tablets, waxes, blotter paper, and plant material to determine the chemical identity.
 Forensic Toxicology Unit – provides forensic toxicology services for state, county, and local law enforcement agencies throughout the state of Oklahoma submitting blood samples in cases involving violation of Title 47 of the Oklahoma State Statutes and for agencies submitting blood and urine in cases involving violent crimes. Services are also provided for agencies submitting beverages for alcoholic content testing.
 Quality System – the OSBI CSD Quality System addresses a myriad of components critical to quality work, including requirements for areas such as personnel (educational requirements, training, competency testing, on-going proficiency testing, etc.), methods (appropriately documented, validated, inclusion of appropriate standards and controls, etc.), and equipment (maintenance, calibration, etc.).  In addition, continuously monitors the quality of services provided and identifies opportunities for improvement.

Support Services Section 
The central business office of OSBI. This section has responsibility for supporting the Director by providing budgeting, procurement and facilities management, human resources, IT services, Information Services, and Professional Standards and Training to the entire Bureau. Under the direction of the OSBI Deputy Director Andrea Fielding, this section is organized as follows:

Administrative Services/Support Services Division

Accounting and Budget Section 
The Accounting and Budget Section is responsible for planning and managing the finances of the agency. Responsibilities include:

 Accounts payable – processes all claims against contracts/purchase orders.
 Accounts Receivable/Billing – generates invoices and submits for payments through grants.
 Budget – prepares the agency Budget Work Program and Budget Request annually, monitors spending plan to ensure sufficient budget.
 Deposits – daily deposits of any fees collected.
 Travel – make travel arrangements for staff, generate and process travel reimbursement claims for staff.
 Reconciliations – monthly reconcile accounts with OMES and OST records.
 Financial reporting – generate financial reports for various stakeholders, both internal and external.

Procurement and Facilities Section 
The Procurement and Facilities Section is responsible for purchasing supplies and equipment, establishing and managing contracts, and managing owned and leased facilities.  Procurement receives delegated authority for procurement per Title 74 Section 85.3H (Oklahoma Central Purchasing Act) from the Office of Management and Enterprises Services State Purchasing Director.  Responsibilities include:

 Procurement of all goods and services with an annual average 2073 Purchase Order or P-Card purchases.
 Assist with writing and reviewing bid specifications, contract terms and conditions, and agency policy and procedures.
 Management of 193 cell phones, 62 hotspots/MiFi devices, Investigative camera data plans and data package connectivity for iPads.
 Manage and maintain office location phone lines for all agency office locations.
 Fleet management, maintenance and repairs for 163 agency owned vehicles across the State.
 Management of the Central Supply Room to include but not limited to the issuing of office supplies, agent clothing and agent specialty equipment.
 Management of the agency mailroom functions, business reply program and small package shipping program.
 Manage and oversee the agency P-Card program per state and OSBI policy.
 Manage and maintain the agency surplus program per state and OSBI procedures and rules.
 Facilities management of agency owned and leased facilities to include but not limited to leases, construction, renovations, maintenance and 24/7 emergency response.
 Responsible for the 24/7 emergency mobilization of the Mobile Analysis Center and agency owned four wheelers for natural disaster or crime scene support.
 Responsible for maintaining facilities to achieve/maintain CALEA and ANAB accreditation.

 Maintaining/modernizing security systems (fire, security, surveillance, and access control) of all facilities.

Human Resources Section 
The Human Resources Section is responsible for all aspects of personnel management, keeping agency management and employees informed of new developments and techniques, researching and preparing human resource policy and procedure. Specific programs administered by this section include:

 Recruitment, selection, and hiring;
 Promotional processes;
 Classification;
 Compensation;
 Employee payroll;
 Time and leave;
 Equal Employment Opportunity;
 Internal grievance management;
 Employee corrective discipline assistance and records keeping;
 Coordination of Performance Management Process;
 Position management;
 Personnel transactions;
 Employee Benefits; and
 Employee orientation.

Information Technology Division

Office of Professional Standards and Training 
The Office of Professional Standards (OPS) ensures the integrity of OSBI personnel and operations. This is done through the oversight of internal investigations, maintenance and security of complaint and investigative records, research and development of agency policies and procedures, and functional reviews of operating units.  The OSBI is accredited through the Commission on Accreditation for Law Enforcement Agencies (CALEA).  The OPS manages and oversees the OSBI’s participation in the program. Integrity in the OSBI begins with the hiring of competent, respected individuals.  Applicants are initially vetted by personnel assigned within the OPS. This is done through a polygraph examination and comprehensive background investigation.  These processes provide OSBI administrators candid, factual information to ascertain if an applicant is suited for a position with the OSBI.

The Training Office coordinates all training for the OSBI.  This includes employee attendance at external training events, coordination and development of in-house training courses and events, and maintaining records related to training received and conducted by OSBI personnel.  The Training Coordinator evaluates training programs and assists in the development and evaluation of agency training needs.  The Training Coordinator is the liaison between the OSBI and CLEET for the purposes of compliance for all commissioned officers employed by the OSBI. It is the responsibility of the Training Office to provide, coordinate, and/or locate training to assist employees in meeting minimum training requirements for supervisory roles as well as commissioned status.  The Training Office is the central repository for all agency training conducted by employees and for accreditation of in-house courses.

Information Services Division 
Created in 1991, the Information Services Division was created as the fourth division within the OSBI and is under operational control of a Division Director who is responsible for the coordination of all division programs. Its purpose is to handle the increased demand for information by law enforcement agencies across the state as well as the public. 

This division is the central repository for all criminal records in Oklahoma and is responsible for collecting data ranging from statewide crime statistics to information for criminal history checks. 

The division is divided into two sections and is organized as follows:

Criminal Identification Section 

 Identification Unit (ID) – manages the 10-print portion of the OSBI database of fingerprints (AFIS), examines, and compares fingerprint images to make positive identifications of arrest records entered by CHMU.
 Criminal History Management Unit (CHMU) – responsible for creating, updating and maintaining Oklahoma Criminal History records. CHMU is also responsible for the sealing and expunging of criminal records as the result of court orders.
 Correlation Services Unit (CSU) – in 2019, this unit was implemented specifically for the purpose of improving the accuracy, completeness, and accessibility of non-Triple I criminal history records. In addition, their efforts help to identify persons that may be prohibited from purchasing or possessing firearms due to domestic violence convictions and/or felony convictions.
 Biometric Field Services Unit (BFSU) – created in 2005 to improve and maintain the efficiency of accurate arrest information submitted to the Oklahoma State Bureau of Investigation (OSBI) by law enforcement agencies.  BFSU is responsible for the training and certification of law enforcement agencies in the use of Livescan devices as well as capturing fingerprints using ink. BFSU is also responsible for the Mobile ID system, an investigative tool used by police officers to help make quick identification of individuals of concern by using a two-finger submission that searches both the OSBI AFIS database and the FBI Repository for Individuals of Special Concern (RISC) database.
 Disposition Services Unit (DSU) – this unit’s primary responsibility is updating arrest records in the state repository with criminal case filings and disposition data. The state's district attorneys and municipal court clerks provide the unit with information on charges filed or declined and final dispositions reached in their jurisdictions.

Data Collection, Licensing and Reporting 

 Criminal History Reporting Unit (CHRU) and CHIRP – This unit is responsible for conducting checks of the criminal history database for non-criminal justice purposes at the request of the public.  Members of the general public as well as businesses can use the automated Criminal History Information Request Portal (CHIRP) to request a name-based criminal history record check electronically.
 Field Services Unit (FSU) – this unit is responsible for Oklahoma's Uniform Crime Reporting System.  State law requires all state, county, city and town law enforcement agencies to report to this system.  FSU employees train agencies in the collection of crime statistics and provide ongoing program support as well as overseeing the installation, maintenance and upgrades for the Offender Data Information System (ODIS) case management system used by over 270 law enforcement agencies in Oklahoma to track reported crimes and their statistics to the State Incident-Based Reporting System (SIBRS).
 Oklahoma Violent Death Reporting System (OKVDRS) - is a collaborative effort between the Oklahoma State Department of Health, Office of the Chief Medical Examiner, and the OSBI.  This national surveillance system collects information on violent deaths to include suicides, homicides, deaths from legal intervention (a subtype of homicide where the victim is killed by or died as a result of law enforcement acting in the line of duty), deaths of undetermined intent, and unintentional firearm fatalities.  
 Self-Defense Act Licensing Unit (SDA) – In 1995, the OSBI was given the responsibility to license Oklahoma residents to carry firearms and the SDA unit was formed. The unit is responsible for the management of the licensees and conducts suspensions or revocations for those who commit infractions while licensed.  Even though applications for an SDA license have declined since the permitless carry bill (11/1/2019) went in to effect, Oklahoman’s can still apply for a permit. One benefit of obtaining a permit is reciprocity, which makes it legal to carry a gun in some other states without needing to obtain a license from each state.
 Oklahoma Statistical Analysis Center (SAC) – The Oklahoma SAC was created August 1, 1989. Since then, the Oklahoma SAC has been housed at the Oklahoma Department of Corrections, Oklahoma Department of Public Safety, and the Oklahoma Criminal Justice Resource Center.  In 2009, the Oklahoma SAC was moved to the Oklahoma State Bureau of Investigation.  Functions of the Oklahoma SAC can be found in 22 O.S. § 1517.

Personnel

Staffing
The Oklahoma State Bureau of Investigation, is one of the larger employers of the State.

Requirements
Per Title 74 O.S. Section 150.8A: In order to be employed as a Law Enforcement Special Agent, an individual must, at the time of employment, “shall be at least twenty one (21) years of age and shall possess a bachelor’s degree from an accredited college or university" and two years of law enforcement experience with a governmental law enforcement agency and must be a certified CLEET peace officer or possess a certification by reciprocity agreement from another state.

Pay Structure for Law Enforcement Agents
As established by Oklahoma law, the annual salaries for OSBI law enforcement agents are as follows:

Budget
The Oklahoma State Bureau of Investigation's budget is generated primarily by annual appropriations from the Oklahoma Legislature. Annual appropriations make up 43% ($27.4 million), 39% generated from the fees charged by the Bureau ($24.4 million), and the remaining 18% ($11.7 million) coming from various other sources.

The majority of OSBI's budget (64% or $40.8 million) is spent on employee benefits and salaries, 32% ($20.2 million) goes to operating expenses and the remaining 4% ($2.5 million) is dedicated to various other expenses.

For fiscal year 2023, each of the operating units of the Bureau operate with the following budgets:

Fallen officers
Since the establishment of the Oklahoma State Bureau of Investigation, 4 officers have died in the line of duty.

See also

Oklahoma Department of Public Safety
Federal Bureau of Investigation
State bureau of investigation

References

External links
OSBI homepage
Unsolved Case - Jack Burris

Bureau of Investigation
1925 establishments in Oklahoma
State Bureaus of Investigation